The 2021 ICF Canoe Slalom World Championships took place from 22 to 26 September 2021 in Bratislava, Slovakia under the auspices of International Canoe Federation (ICF). It was the 41st edition. The events took place at the Čunovo Water Sports Centre which was reconstructed before the championships. Bratislava hosted the championships for the second time after previously hosting in 2011.

Bratislava also hosted the 2021 Wildwater Canoeing World Championships as part of the same event.

Schedule
Ten medal events were contested.

All times listed are UTC+2.

Medal summary

Medal table

Men

Canoe

Kayak

Women

Canoe

Kayak

References

ICF Canoe Slalom World Championships
World Championships
ICF
International sports competitions hosted by Slovakia
Sport in Bratislava
Canoeing in Slovakia
ICF